Ramnavallen  is a football stadium in Borås, Sweden  and the former home stadium for the football teams IF Elfsborg and Norrby IF. Ramnavallen has a total capacity of 4,000 spectators.

References 

Football venues in Sweden